David Copperfield is a British six-part television serial of the 1850 Charles Dickens novel adapted by Hugh Whitemore, directed by Joan Craft and first shown on BBC 1 in weekly parts from 1 December 1974 to 5 January 1975. It was a co-production with Time-Life Television Productions. It is the earliest BBC adaptation to exist in its entirety. The 1956 adaptation is completely lost, whilst only four of the 1966 adaptation's episodes are known to exist.

Plot
For a detailed plot, see David Copperfield (novel).

Cast
 Jonathan Kahn as David Copperfield (child) 
 David Yelland as David Copperfield (adult) 
 Martin Jarvis as Uriah Heep
 Arthur Lowe as Wilkins Micawber. 
 David Troughton as Ham Peggotty
 Ian Hogg as Dan Peggotty
 Timothy Bateson as Mr. Dick
 Patience Collier as Betsey Trotwood
 Anthony Andrews as Steerforth 
 Patricia Routledge as Mrs. Micawber
 Pat Keen as Peggotty

Critical reception
This version was generally well received. In Clive James review for The Observer he wrote: "David Copperfield is as good as everybody says. Steerforth's flaw is well conveyed by Anthony Andrews, and Uriah Heep, played by Martin Jarvis, is a miracle of unction: to hear him talk is like stepping on a toad long dead. But Arthur Lowe's Micawber is better than anything. He follows W. C. Fields in certain respects, but is graciously spoken; and his gestures are as delicate as Oliver Hardy's. Not that his performance is eclectic - it is a subtle unity like everything he attempts."

References

External links
  
 

BBC television dramas
1974 British television series debuts
1975 British television series endings
Television shows based on David Copperfield